"Lay Down (Candles in the Rain)" is the second single from Melanie Safka's 1970 album Candles in the Rain. It was her breakthrough hit in the United States, climbing to number six on the Billboard Hot 100 and number three on the Cash Box Top 100. The record was ranked number 23 on the Billboard Year-End Hot 100 singles of 1970. It was released in March 1970.

Background
The recording was a collaboration between Melanie and the Edwin Hawkins Singers, who had reached the national Top Ten the previous year with "Oh Happy Day". Melanie wrote the song after performing at Woodstock in August 1969; the song's lyrics describe what she felt as she looked out at the sea of people in the audience.

Charts

Covers
Australian singer Max Sharam released the song as a single from her 1995 album, A Million Year Girl. It reached No. 36 on the ARIA Singles Chart in November 1995. Icelandic singer Emilíana Torrini recorded a version that reached No. 1 on the Íslenski Listinn Topp 40 in mid-1996.

See also
List of anti-war songs

References

1970 singles
1970 songs
Buddah Records singles
Dutch Top 40 number-one singles
Melanie (singer) songs
Number-one singles in Iceland
RPM Top Singles number-one singles
Woodstock Festival